Givenchy-en-Gohelle is a commune in the Pas-de-Calais department in the Hauts-de-France region of France. The village was destroyed during World War I but was rebuilt after the war.

Geography
Its neighboring communes are Souchez to the west, Angres to the northwest, Liévin to the north, Avion to the east and Vimy to the southeast.

The Bois de Givenchy or Givenchy Forest, covers much of the commune on its northern side. To further the agricultural range of products, the commune of Givenchy-en-Gohelle have planted grapes (chardonnay and pinot gris). The first grape harvest took place in 2000.

First World War
During the First World War, Givenchy-en-Gohelle  was on the front line between German and Allied forces during the battles of Arras and was severely damaged, particularly during the Battle of Vimy Ridge in 1917. For much of the First World War, the village also was the site of sustained underground fighting between German and British tunneling units. Givenchy-en-Gohelle was taken by the 2nd Canadian Division on 13 April 1917. Over 150 war casualties (1914-1918) are commemorated at the Canadian cemetery here and 109 from the Battle of Vimy Ridge are buried here.

The centennial commemoration of the Battle of Vimy Ridge was held at the Canadian National Vimy Memorial near the village on 9 April 2017. Estimates before the event indicated that up to 30,000 would attend.

By early April 2017, the village had been decorated with 500 Canadian flags.

Population

Places of interest
 The Canadian National Vimy Memorial to commemorate  First World War Canadian dead and missing, presumed dead, in France.
 The church of St. Martin, dating from the seventeenth century.
 The Commonwealth War Graves Commission Canadian memorial and cemeteries.

See also
Communes of the Pas-de-Calais department

References

External links

 The CWGC burials in the churchyard
 The CWGC cemetery at Souchez
 The Vimy Memorial on the CWGC site
 The local winegrowers' website 
 Official commune website 
 Regional website

Gallery

Givenchyengohelle
Artois